The West Wales Intermediate Challenge Cup is the regional knock-out competition for clubs beneath the umbrella of the West Wales Football Association, at the level of Tier 4 and below of the Welsh Football Pyramid in South West Wales.

The tournament invites clubs typically from the top divisions of the Carmarthenshire League, Neath & District League, Pembrokeshire League and Swansea Senior League.

Since winning in 2015 and 2017 Team Swansea have been promoted to Tier 2 of the Welsh Football Pyramid, now playing in the Cymru South as Swansea University.

History
The competition started in the 1923–24 season and was known until the 1973-74 season as the West Wales Amateur Cup. Since the 1974-75 season it has been has been called the Intermediate Cup but is also commonly referred to as the West Wales Cup.

Recent Finals

Previous winners

1920s

 1923–24: – Swansea Amateurs
 1924–25: – Cwm Athletic 
 1925–26: – Swansea Town
 1926–27: – Cwm Athletic 
 1927–28: – Cwm Athletic 
 1928–29: – Aberpergwm
 1929–30: – Cwm Athletic

1930s

 1930–31: – Llanelli A 
 1931–32: – Alexandra 
 1932–33: – Skewen
 1933–34: – Royal Fusiliers
 1934–35: – Glyn Neath Welfare 
 1935–36: – Hafod Brotherhood
 1936–37: – Alexandra
 1937–38: – Alexandra
 1938–39: – Swansea Nomads
 1939–40: – No competition

1940s

 1940–41: – No competition
 1941–42: – No competition
 1942–43: – Gwalia Stars 
 1943–44: – Loughor Rovers
 1944–45: – Loughor Rovers
 1945–46: – Grovesend Welfare
 1946–47: – Royal Naval Air Station
 1947–48: – Bwlch Rangers
 1948–49: – No competition
 1949–50: – Goodwick United

1950s

 1950–51: – National Oil Refineries
 1951–52: – Atlas Sports 
 1952–53: – Atlas Sports 
 1953–54: – Clydach United
 1954–55: – Grovesend Welfare
 1955–56: – N.O.R. Sports 
 1956–57: – Hakin United
 1957–58: – Narberth
 1958–59: – Ynysmeudwy
 1959–60: – Clydach

1960s

 1960–61: – Llanelli 
 1961–62: – Llanelli Steel 
 1962–63: – Ammanford United
 1963–64: – Llanelli Steel 
 1964–65: – Llanelli Steel 
 1965–66: – Pengelli
 1966–67: – Pengelli
 1967–68: – Ragged School
 1968–69: – West End 
 1969–70: – St. Josephs

1970s

 1970–71: – North End
 1971–72: – Hafod Brotherhood 
 1972–73: – St. Josephs
 1973–74: – Fishguard Sports
 1974–75: – West End
 1975–76: – Swansea Boys Club 
 1976–77: – Velindre Sports
 1977–78: – West End
 1978–79: – Swansea Boys Club
 1979–80: – Bonymaen Colts

1980s

 1980–81: – Ragged School
 1981–82: – St Josephs
 1982–83: – West End
 1983–84: – Winch Wen
 1984–85: – Suburbs
 1985–86: – North End
 1986–87: – Maltsters Sports
 1986–87: – Port Tennant Colts
 1988–89: – Trostre Sports
 1989–90: – Competition Void

1990s

 1990–91: – Ragged School
 1991–92: – North End 
 1992–93: – Ragged School
 1993–94: – West End
 1994–95: – Ragged School
 1995–96: – Treboeth United
 1996–97: – Brunswick United
 1997–98: – West End
 1998–99: – Hakin United
 1999–2000: – Mountain Dew Rovers

2000s

 2000–01: – Ragged School
 2001–02: – West End
 2002–03: – Seaside
 2003–04: – Hakin United
 2004–05: – Winch Wen
 2005–06: – St. Josephs 
 2006–07: –  Winch Wen
 2007–08: – Seaside
 2008–09: – South Gower
 2009–10: – Coelbren Athletic

2010s 

 2010–11: – Ragged School
 2011–12: – Dafen Welfare
 2012–13: – Johnston
 2013–14: – Penlan Club
 2014–15: – Team Swansea
 2015–16: – Goodwick United
 2016–17: – Team Swansea
 2017–18: – Goodwick United
 2018–19: – Merlins Bridge
 2019–20: – Competition cancelled due to Covid-19 pandemic

2020s 

 2020–21:  – Competition cancelled due to Covid-19 pandemic
 2021–22: – Seven Sisters Onllwyn

Number of competition wins

 Ragged School – 7
 West End – 7
 Cwm Athletic – 4
 Alexandra – 3
 Goodwick United – 3
 Hafod Brotherhood/ Swansea Nomads – 3
 Hakin United – 3
 Llanelli Steel - 3
 North End – 3
 St Josephs – 3
 Seaside – 3
 Winch Wen – 3
 Atlas Sports – 2
 Grovesend Welfare – 2
 Llanelli / Llanelli A – 2
 Loughor Rovers – 2
 National Oil Refineries - 2
 Pengelli - 2
 Swansea Boys Club – 2
 Team Swansea - 2
 Aberpergwm – 1
 Ammanford United – 1
 Bonymaen Colts - 1
 Brunswick United – 1
 Bwlch Rangers – 1
 Clydach - 1
 Clydach United – 1
 Coelbren Athletic – 1
 Dafen Welfare – 1
 Fishguard Sports – 1
 Glyn Neath Welfare – 1
 Gwalia Stars – 1
 Johnston – 1
 Maltsters Sports – 1
 Merlins Bridge – 1
 Mountain Dew Rovers - 1
 Narberth - 1
 Penlan Club – 1
 Port Tennant Colts – 1
 Royal Naval Air Station - 1
 Royal Fusiliers - 1
 Seven Sisters Onllwyn – 1
 Skewen - 1
 South Gower – 1
 Suburbs - 1
 Swansea Amateurs – 1
 Swansea Town – 1
 Treboeth United – 1
 Trostre Sports – 1
 Velindre Sports - 1
 Ynysmeudwy - 1

References

Football cup competitions in Wales
1923 establishments in Wales
Football in Wales
County Cup competitions
Recurring events established in 1923